Gang Bullets is a 1938 American crime drama film directed by Lambert Hillyer.

The film is also known as The Crooked Way in the United Kingdom.

Plot summary
A ruthless but clever gangster who knows every loophole in the law has the tables turned by a dedicated district attorney and his assistant.

Cast

See also
Turner Classic Movies
You Tube
Archive

References

External links

 (alternative link)

1938 films
1938 crime drama films
American black-and-white films
Monogram Pictures films
American crime drama films
Films directed by Lambert Hillyer
1930s English-language films
1930s American films